Jenny Robinson Syquia-Skarne (born November 2, 1967) is a Filipina-American Swedish model, actress and fashion designer.

Personal life
Syquia was born in Binghamton, New York. Her father, Victor Syquia was born in the Philippines and her mother, Susan Syquia (née Robinson), is American.

Syquia is the niece of the late ambassador Enrique Syquia (Ambassador Extraordinary and Plenipotentiary of the Sovereign Military Order of Malta to the Philippine Government). (In addition Ambassador Syquia was nominated twice as a candidate to the UN International Court of Justice in The Hague and was the Honorary Counsel General of Jordan.). The ancestral home of the heirs of Gregorio Syquia in the Philippines, the Syquia Mansion, is now a museum and a part of the UNESCO world heritage site in Vigan.

In June 1993, after a whirlwind courtship, Syquia married multi-award-winning actor Gabby Concepcion in Las Vegas. She became the stepmother to KC Concepcion (Gabby’s daughter with his ex-wife, Philippine actress Sharon Cuneta).  On August 17, 1994 Syquia gave birth to her first daughter, Cloie Syquia Skarne (better known by her stage name, Cloie Concepcion) (who would go on to become a TV host and performer in the Philippines in addition to winning the Miss Earth Sweden title in 2016). The marriage between Concepcion and Syquia was annulled in 1996.

In 1997 Syquia married Filip Skarne. He legally adopted the two-year-old Cloie. She has a second daughter, Filippa Babes with Skarne.

Career

Magazine editing
In 1994 Syquia founded and became the editor-in-chief of Bride Philippines magazine. Bride Philippines was that country's first magazine for brides.

Modeling
After graduating from college, Syquia modeled commercially in the Philippines and endorsed such products as Palmolive Optima shampoo and Queenie Cosmetics among others. She also modeled in Boston for Maggie, Inc.

Acting

Television

Movies
Syquia began her movie career in 1996. She signed an eight-picture contract with the Philippines' largest and most-successful entertainment management group, Viva Entertainment.

Fashion Designer
Along with half-sister Christine, Jenny Syquia founded the handbag and accessories line Charm & Luck in 2004. They received an influx of $9 million in funding from Capstone Trade in 2006. Celebrities such as Lindsay Lohan, Jessica Simpson and Paris Hilton were customers. In 2007, this company was nominated for Best Accessories company at the Dallas Fashion Awards.

By 2008, their "kitschy, fun styles" were carried in more than 1,700 stores in 25 countries, including Dillards, Nordstrom, Bloomingdale’s and Lord & Taylor. Charm and Luck was regularly featured on the Home Shopping Network.

After the birth of her second daughter, Syquia decided to become a full-time mother.

She re-signed with Viva Entertainment in 2012.

References

1967 births
Living people
Filipino film actresses
Filipino people of American descent
Filipino publishers (people)
Filipino television personalities
Artists from Binghamton, New York
Quirino family
Actors from Binghamton, New York